Nikos Ziabaris (born 18 February 1991) is a Greek professional footballer who plays as a defender for Super League 2 club Panserraikos.

Club career

He started his professional career at Megas Alexandros Irakleia, from where he transferred to current club Kerkyra in the summer of 2011. During the 2012–13 season he was under contract with Kavala failing to make any appearances throughout the season.  He played for Fostiras for the 2013–14 season appearing in 27 matches and scoring 1 goal. On 14 July 2014 he signed for Greek Football League club Iraklis. Ziabaris debuted for Iraklis in the opening game of the season against Pierikos. He scored his first goal for the club in a home win against Apollon Kalamarias.

References

External links
Onsports.gr profile 
 
Football League News player profile 

1991 births
Living people
Iraklis Thessaloniki F.C. players
A.O. Kerkyra players
Kavala F.C. players
Super League Greece players
Greek footballers
Olympiakos Nicosia players
Association football defenders
Footballers from Serres